The 3rd Washington D.C. Area Film Critics Association Awards, honoring the best in filmmaking in 2004, were given on December 17, 2004.

Winners
 Best Film
 Eternal Sunshine of the Spotless Mind
 Best Actor
 Jamie Foxx – Ray
 Best Actress
 Imelda Staunton – Vera Drake
 Best Supporting Actor
 Jamie Foxx – Collateral
 Best Supporting Actress
 Cate Blanchett – The Aviator
 Best Director
 Michel Gondry – Eternal Sunshine of the Spotless Mind
 Best Ensemble
 Eternal Sunshine of the Spotless Mind
 Best Original Screenplay
 Alexander Payne and Jim Taylor – Sideways
 Best Adapted Screenplay
 Charlie Kaufman – Eternal Sunshine of the Spotless Mind
 Best Foreign Language Film
 Maria Full of Grace
 Best Animated Feature
 The Incredibles
 Best Documentary
 Fahrenheit 9/11

References

External links
 2004 WAFCA Awards

2004
2004 film awards